Harold Homer "Jack" Petticord (21 November 1900  – 2 January 1940) was an American racecar driver, born in Wichita, Kansas.  He drove for the Essex racing team in 1922 and 1923, as well as for the Boyle Valve racing team in 1927. Primarily a dirt track racer, Petticord made starts in both IMCA Big Cars and AAA Championship Car including the 1927 Indianapolis 500. He also served as a relief driver later in that race for Al Melcher and then the next year was a relief driver for Ira Hall. In 1934, he again attempted to qualify for the Indy 500 but failed to do so. He failed to qualify in 1938 as well.  He died in Chicago, Illinois and is buried in Highland Cemetery in Wichita, Kansas.

Indianapolis 500 results

References

1900 births
1940 deaths
Indianapolis 500 drivers
Racing drivers from Chicago